Calvin Watson (born 6 January 1993) is an Australian former professional cyclist, who rode professionally between 2012 and 2018 for the Team Jayco–AIS,  and  teams.

Major results

2010
 3rd Road race, National Junior Road Championships
 6th Road race, UCI Juniors Road World Championships
2011
 1st  Road race, National Junior Road Championships
 1st Overall Tour du Valromey
2012
 3rd Road race, National Under-23 Road Championships
 4th Overall Giro della Regione Friuli Venezia Giulia
 8th Trofeo Città di San Vendemiano
 8th Trofeo Alcide Degasperi
 10th Overall New Zealand Cycle Classic
2013
 1st  Overall Herald Sun Tour
 10th Trofeo Città di San Vendemiano

References

External links

1993 births
Living people
Australian male cyclists